A list of films produced in Italy in 1955 (see 1955 in film):

A-H

I-L

M-Z

References

External links
Italian films of 1955 on IMDb

Italian
1955
Films